Maria Kaupas, S.S.C., (January 6, 1880 – April 17, 1940) was an American Catholic religious sister who founded the Sisters of Saint Casimir.

She was born Casimira Kaupas in Ramygala, Russian Empire. At the age of 17, she emigrated to the United States, where she settled in Scranton, Pennsylvania, to work as a housekeeper for her brother, Anthony Kaupas, who was pastor of St. Joseph Parish there. While there, she had her first contact with religious sisters and was attracted by their way of life. She also became aware of her countrymen's struggle due to the language barrier, especially in their spiritual life.

Overcome by homesickness, Kaupas returned to Lithuania in 1901, but she kept seeking to determine where her call in life was. She soon resolved to become a teaching Sister, especially committed to the care of the Lithuanian immigrants in America.

Kaupas' brother soon informed her that the Lithuanian clergy in the United States sought to establish a new community of religious sisters dedicated to teaching the youth of their community in a religious setting and preserving their native language and customs. She was asked to lead this new venture, and she began her studies toward this end with the Sisters of Mercy of the Holy Cross in Switzerland in October 1902. Although the Priests Council disbanded in 1904, Kaupas determined nonetheless to pursue the idea of a new religious congregation.

In 1905 Jeremiah F. Shanahan, Bishop of the Roman Catholic Diocese of Harrisburg, Pennsylvania, agreed to sponsor this new congregation. M. Cyril accepted Kaupas and two companions into the novitiate of the Sisters, Servants of the Immaculate Heart of Mary, based in Scranton, for their preparation for consecrated life. At that time, she received the religious name of Sister Maria. On August 29, 1907, Kaupas made her profession of religious vows, and the Congregation of the Sisters of St. Casimir was founded.

The Sisters immediately began to work in the parochial schools of the region. In 1911, they established their motherhouse in Chicago, where there was a large Lithuanian population. They began to staff schools in Lithuanian parishes of the city. Over time, Sisters were sent to teach in many parishes across the United States, Lithuanian and non-Lithuanian. Their service also came to include home missions in New Mexico. In 1928, the Sisters of St. Casimir began their health care ministry with Holy Cross Hospital's opening in Chicago.
 
She founded the beautiful school Villa Joseph Marie in Holland, Pennsylvania. This school remains thriving to this day. It is situated on beautiful acres of property at the corner of Holland and middle Holland Road. It has roughly under 400 students and 40 faculty members. It has countless elective opportunities, clubs, and classes available. Students often attend highly selective universities post VJMHS graduation. See http://www.vjmhs.org/ for more information.

Kaupas died in Chicago, Illinois, on April 17, 1940. In 2010, she was found to have lived a life of heroic virtue by the Congregation for the Causes of Saints in Rome and was declared Venerable.

See also

 List of venerable people
 List of saints
 List of blesseds
 List of Servants of God

References

External links
 Official website of the Sisters of Saint Casimir
 Patron Saints Index

1880 births
1940 deaths
People from Ramygala
Emigrants from the Russian Empire to the United States
20th-century American Roman Catholic nuns
20th-century venerated Christians
Founders of Catholic religious communities
Venerated Catholics by Pope Benedict XVI
American venerated Catholics